The One-Day Cup, known as the Marsh One-Day Cup for sponsorship reasons, is an Australian domestic List A 50-over limited-overs cricket tournament. It has had many different names, formats and teams since the inaugural 1969-1970 season. Initially a knockout cup, the competition now features a single round-robin followed by a finals series.

The tournament is contested between teams representing the six states of Australia, who also compete in the first-class Sheffield Shield. Three other teams have also played in the tournament for short periods of time: New Zealand's national team competed from 1969–70 until the 1974–75, Australian Capital Territory participated from 1997–98 until 1999–2000, and a select Cricket Australia XI took part as the seventh team for three seasons from 2015–16 until 2017–18. The current champions are Western Australia.

History
England was the first country to introduce a domestic one-day limited-overs competition with its Gillette Cup in 1963. Australia was the next country to do so when this competition was established in 1969–70. It has been held every summer since, under a wide variety of names and formats. It is a List A cricket competition. It was the first List A competition to feature numbers on player's shirts when they were introduced for the 1995–96 season and numbers were also subsequently introduced for the ODI series later in the season. In September 2017, former Australian Test cricketer Jason Gillespie suggested that Papua New Guinea should be added to the competition.

Seasons and competition formats
1969/70–1978/79 – Straight knockout
1979/80–1981/82 – 2 pools of 3, semi-finals, 3rd/4th playoff and final
1982/83–1991/92 – 2 pools of 3, semi-finals and final
1992/93–1999/2000 – Single round robin (i.e. home OR away), preliminary final and final
2000/01–2010/11 – Double round robin home and away plus final.
2011/12–2012/13 – Partial round robin (8 matches per team, 3 of 5 opponents played both home and away), plus final.
2013/14 – Carnival format, 6 round games, preliminary final and final.
2014/15 – Carnival format, 7 round games, preliminary final and final.
2015/16–2017/18 – Carnival format, 8 round games, preliminary final and final.
2018/19 – Single round robin, 2 qualification finals, 2 semi-finals and final.
2019/20–present – Carnival format, 7 round games and final

Seasons of sponsorship and competition names
 1969/70 - 1970/71 - Vehicle & General Australasian Knock-out Competition
 1971/72 - 1972/73 - Coca-Cola Australasian Knock-out Competition
 1973/74 - 1978/79 - Gillette Cup
 1979/80 - 1987/88 - McDonald's Cup
 1988/89 - 1991/92 - FAI Cup
 1992/93 - 2000/01 - Mercantile Mutual Cup
 2001/02 - 2005/06 - ING Cup
 2006/07 - 2009/10 - Ford Ranger Cup
 2010/11 - 2013/14 - Ryobi One-Day Cup
 2014/15 - 2016/17 - Matador BBQs One-Day Cup
 2017/18 - 2018/19 - JLT One-Day Cup
 2019/20 - 2022/23 - Marsh One-Day Cup

Teams

 Titles correct up to the end of the 2022 season.
 Each team has used several venues to host matches. For a full list, see list of cricket grounds in Australia.
 New Zealand did not play home games in this series.

Competition placings

For a complete list of finals with short scorecards and crowd figures, see Australian Domestic One-Day Cricket Final.

1 The 1982–83 final was originally washed out, and then rescheduled at the beginning of the 1983–84 season.
3 – Won third place playoff
4 – Lost third place playoff

1969–70 to present

Leading run-scorers and wicket-takers for each team
Career statistics include all matches up to the end of the 2018–19 season.

Player of the tournament

Records and statistics

Last updated on 27 February 2023

Points system
Points are awarded as follows:
 4 points for a win
 2 points for a no-result or a tie
 0 points for a loss
 1 bonus point if a team achieves a run rate 1.25 times that of the opposition
 2 bonus points if a team achieves a run rate twice that of the opposition

The top two teams at the end of the pool matches play-off in the final. The higher-placed team has the home ground advantage.

Television coverage
In 2006–07, the Ford Ranger One Day Cup was televised on Fox Sports. 25 out of the 31 games were televised including the final. Prior to Fox Sports' broadcasting of the domestic cricket competition, Nine was the host broadcaster. In India STAR Cricket shows the telecast with the help of Fox Sports. In 2011–12 Fox Sports broadcast all 25 games of the Ryobi One Day Cup live. The Nine Network became the rights holder once again from season 2013–14 to the 2016–17 season, primarily showing matches Live on GEM and simulcasting via Cricket Australia's website. There are negotiations in place with ITV to televise the competition in the UK.

For the 2017–18 season, the Nine Network dropped its coverage of the JLT One Day Cup. All matches were streamed live and free on Cricket Australia's own website and app.

It was announced on 13 April 2018 that from the 2018–19 season, Fox Sports will broadcast 13 matches of the tournament each year for six years on the new Fox Cricket channel. All remaining matches will be streamed live on Cricket Australia's website and app.

See also

Australian Domestic One-Day Cricket Final

Notes

References

External links
For match results and individual scorecards, see:
 Cricinfo Australian Domestic Cricket Archive
 The Cricket Archive, Australian Tournaments

Australian domestic cricket competitions
Recurring sporting events established in 1969
1969 establishments in Australia
Sports leagues established in 1969
List A cricket competitions
Professional sports leagues in Australia